Indian Railways divides its operations into zones, which are further sub-divided into divisions, each having a divisional headquarters. There are a total of 19 zones (including Metro Railway, Kolkata) and 70 Divisions on Indian Railway System. Each of the divisions is headed by a Divisional Railway Manager (DRM), who reports to the General Manager (GM) of the zone. A DRM can be appointed from any of the eight organized services of Indian Railways, viz. Indian Railway Service of Signal Engineers (IRSSE), Indian Railway Accounts Service (IRAS), Indian Railway Personnel Service (IRPS), Indian Railway Service of Engineers (IRSE), Indian Railway Service of Mechanical Engineers (IRSME), Indian Railway Service of Electrical Engineers (IRSEE), Indian Railway Traffic Service (IRTS)  and Indian Railway Stores Service (IRSS) for the tenure of three years, but it can be exceeded on the recommendation of Railway Board. The DRM is assisted by one or two Additional Divisional Railway Managers (ADRM) in the working of the division. Divisional officers heading all departments viz. Stores, engineering, mechanical, electrical, signal and telecommunication, accounts, personnel, operating, commercial, safety, medical, security branches report to the Divisional Railway Manager.

List of zones and its divisions

The 18 zones and their 70 divisions are listed below. South Coast Railway zone is the newest zone in Indian Railways.

Kolkata is the city with most Zonal Headquarters of Indian Railways having the headquarters of Eastern Zone, South Eastern zone and Metro Railway, Kolkata.

Departments
All the departments and services of the Indian Railways are represented in a Division.

Control Room
Every division has a Control Room for train operations, where all the trains in the division are controlled and monitored. There are different types of control rooms such as engineering control, mechanical control, electric control, commercial control etc. which coordinate with operating control and employees of the respective department.

Accident Relief Trains
Every division has Accident Relief Trains (ARTs), Accident Relief Medical Vans (ARMVs) and Breakdown Cranes for assisting in disaster management. These are under the supervision of the Senior Divisional Mechanical of Engineering (SrDME) of the Division, who is also the head of Division.

Locomotive Sheds
The Diesel Locomotive Sheds and Electric Locomotive Sheds in the division maintain diesel and electric locomotives respectively. Their administrative control is with the Divisional Railway Manager (DRM).

Coaching Depots and Sick Lines
Every division has some coaching depots to maintain its passenger trains and freight depot for maintain freight trains & sick lines to maintain coaching & freight cars which are found unfit at the examination points.

Notes

See also
 Indian Railways organisational structure
 Nizam's Guaranteed State Railway

References

External links
 Zones & Divisions of Indian Railways